Tayeb Korbosli (born ) is a Tunisian male volleyball player. He is part of the Tunisia men's national volleyball team. On club level he plays for C O Kelibia.

References

External links
 profile at FIVB.org

1993 births
Living people

Tunisian men's volleyball players
Place of birth missing (living people)